Anil Adhikari may refer to:
 Anil Adhikari, better known by his stage name Yama Buddha (1987–2017), Nepalese rapper
 Anil Adhikari (politician) (1949–2019), Indian politician